Elections were held in Simcoe County, Ontario on October 24, 2022 in conjunction with municipal elections across the province.

Simcoe County Council
The county council consists of the mayors and deputy mayors of the municipalities.

Adjala-Tosorontio
The following were the results for mayor and deputy mayor of Adjala-Tosorontio.

Mayor

Deputy mayor

Bradford West Gwillimbury
The following were the results for mayor, deputy mayor and town council of Bradford West Gwillimbury.

Mayor
Incumbent mayor Rob Keffer has announced his retirement.

Deputy mayor

Bradford West Gwillimbury Town Council

Clearview
The following were the results for mayor and deputy mayor of Clearview.

Mayor

Deputy mayor

Collingwood
The following were the results for mayor and deputy mayor of Collingwood.

Mayor
Previous mayor Brian Saunderson was elected in the 2022 Ontario general election  for the Progressive Conservative Party of Ontario in Simcoe—Grey. He was replaced as mayor by Keith Hull on June 20.

Deputy mayor

Essa

Mayor
Sandie Macdonald was re-elected as mayor of Essa by acclamation.

Deputy mayor
Michael Smith was re-elected as deputy mayor of Essa by acclamation.

Innisfil
The following results for mayor, deputy mayor and town council of Innisfil were as follows.

Mayor

Deputy mayor

Innisfil Town Council

Midland
The following were the results for mayor and deputy mayor of Midland.

Mayor

Deputy mayor

New Tecumseth
The following were the results for mayor, deputy mayor and town council of New Tecumseth.

Mayor
Incumbent mayor Rick Milne did not run for re-election. Running for mayor was deputy mayor Richard Norcross, and town councillor Donna Jebb, and Tony Veltri.

Deputy mayor

New Tecumseth Town Council

Oro-Medonte

Mayor
The following were the results for mayor of Oro-Medonte.

Penetanguishene

Mayor
Incumbent mayor Doug Leroux ran for council. Running to replace him was former town councillor Doug Rawson and town councillor Jill St. Amant.

Deputy mayor
The following were the results for deputy mayor of Penetanguishene.

Ramara
The following were the results for mayor and deputy mayor of Ramara.

Mayor
Incumbent mayor Basil Clarke was challenged by former township councillor Marg Sharpe in a re-match of the 2018 election.

Deputy mayor

Severn
The following were the results for mayor and deputy mayor of Severn.

Mayor

Deputy mayor

Springwater
The following were the results for mayor and deputy mayor of Springwater.

Mayor

Deputy mayor

Tay
The following were the results for mayor and deputy mayor of Tay.

Mayor

Deputy mayor

Tiny
The following were the results for mayor and deputy mayor of Tiny.

Mayor
Running for mayor was former township councillor Tony Mintoff and sales and marketing manager David Evans. Incumbent mayor George Cornell did not for re-election.

Deputy mayor

Wasaga Beach
The following were the results for mayor and deputy mayor of Wasaga Beach.

Mayor

Deputy mayor

References

Simcoe
Simcoe County